Basketball in Andorra is organized by the Andorran Basketball Federation (Catalan: Federació Andorrana de Basquetbol).

Andorran national teams participates in FIBA Europe competitions. The senior teams play in Division C and also in the Games of the Small States of Europe.

National league
Andorra has got also an amateur men league called Lliga Andorrana de Bàsquet (Andorran Basketball League). There are only five teams participating in this competition on 2010-11 season. They play a round-robin regular season and later, the champion is determine in the playoffs.

There is also a professional basketball club called BC Andorra, which plays in Liga ACB, the top level of Spanish basketball.

Clubs in Lliga Andorrana de Bàsquet 2011–12
Bàsquet Femení Andorra (women's team)
BC Encamp
BC Principat
Filand
Insitu B52 Bàsquet
UE Engordany

See also
Andorran Basketball Federation
Andorra national basketball team

External links
Andorran Basketball Federation website (Catalan)